Han Solo is a fictional character in the Star Wars franchise created by George Lucas. The character first appeared in the 1977 film Star Wars portrayed by Harrison Ford, who reprised his role in The Empire Strikes Back (1980) and Return of the Jedi (1983). Ford returned to the role for The Force Awakens (2015), as well as a brief cameo in The Rise of Skywalker (2019). In the spin-off film Solo (2018), a younger version of the character is portrayed by Alden Ehrenreich.

First appearing in the original trilogy, Han Solo and his first mate Chewbacca are smugglers who are hired by Ben Kenobi and Luke Skywalker to transport them to Alderaan so they can deliver the stolen plans for the Death Star. Although initially unwilling to join the Rebel Alliance in their fight against the Galactic Empire, he eventually does so and in the process falls in love with Princess Leia, whom he eventually marries, becoming Luke's brother in-law. In the sequel trilogy set decades later, Solo joins forces with scavenger Rey and former stormtrooper Finn to help them and the Resistance in their fight against the First Order, whose forces are led by Supreme Leader Snoke and Kylo Ren, the latter of whom is his and Leia's son, Ben Solo who fell to the dark side of the Force, which caused him and Leia to separate. Han is killed by his son but eventually returns as a memory to his son and helps redeem him back to the light side of the Force. 

The American Film Institute has named Solo as the 14th best film hero. Mythologist Joseph Campbell has described the character, "He thinks he's an egoist; but he really isn't. ... there's something else pushing [him]." In 1997, Lucas described Han as "a cynical loner who realizes the importance of being part of a group and helping for the common good".

Ever since his debut, Han Solo has remained one of the most famous characters from the Star Wars series. In addition to the character being hailed as one of cinema's greatest heroes, Harrison Ford's performances in the franchise have received significant acclaim from critics and fans. Alden Ehrenreich's performance in Solo was also well received. Ford received two nominations for the Saturn Award for Best Actor, winning for his performance in The Force Awakens.

Concept and casting

In the earliest version of the initial draft for Star Wars, Solo was an alien of the 'Ureallian' race with green skin, no nose and enormous gills, also being a member of the Jedi Bendu and being acquainted with General Skywalker. The following draft saw Solo as a bearded, flamboyant pirate, franchise creator George Lucas settling on making him a human to better develop the relationship between the three central characters (Luke, Leia and Han) and Chewbacca instead being used for the part of the alien sidekick.<ref name=":0">Lucas, George (2004). The Characters of 'Star Wars''', Star Wars Trilogy DVD. 20th Century Fox Home Entertainment. Event occurs at 5.</ref> By the time of the third draft, Solo had developed into the "tough James Dean style starpilot" that would appear in the finished film. Lucas also used Humphrey Bogart as a point of reference in his development notes. Mythologist Joseph Campbell said of Han, "He thinks he's an egoist; but he really isn't. ... there's something else pushing [him]." In 1997, Lucas described him as "a cynical loner who realizes the importance of being part of a group and helping for the common good". In 2004, Lucas explained that Han is the selfish sidekick of protagonist Luke, who is selfless.

Harrison Ford was not immediately cast for the role of Han Solo, as Lucas had already used him in the film American Graffiti and wanted somebody new for the role. He hired Ford to rehearse lines with other actors and he was so impressed by the actor's performance that he eventually gave him the role. Other actors that were considered for the role include Al Pacino, Robert De Niro, James Caan, Christopher Walken, Jack Nicholson, Sylvester Stallone, Kurt Russell, Bill Murray, Steve Martin, Robert Englund, Nick Nolte, Burt Reynolds, Chevy Chase, and Perry King (who later played Han Solo in the radio plays).Empire of Dreams: The Story of the Star Wars Trilogy. Star Wars Trilogy Box Set DVD documentary. [2005]

Solo appeared in early drafts of Star Wars: Episode III – Revenge of the Sith. The character would have been revealed as having been raised by Chewbacca on Kashyyyk, and would help Yoda locate General Grievous. Some concept art of a 10-year-old Han Solo was made, but Lucas decided to omit the character's appearance from the film before any actor was cast or considered for the role.

Ford, believing his character should die, was reluctant to sign onto the sequels of Star Wars. Han Solo's death in The Force Awakens came about when writer/director J. J. Abrams felt the character was not evolving or contributing to the story's development; he believed that Kylo Ren killing his own father would give him a chance to develop into a worthy successor for Darth Vader. Solo's appearance in the film was influenced by that of Rooster Cogburn (Jeff Bridges) in True Grit (2010) during early concept development.

Appearances
Skywalker saga

Original trilogy

A New Hope
Han Solo is first introduced in Star Wars (1977), when he and his co-pilot Chewbacca (Peter Mayhew) accept a charter request to transport Luke Skywalker, Obi-Wan Kenobi, C-3PO, and R2-D2 from Tatooine to Alderaan on their ship, the Millennium Falcon. Han owes gangster Jabba the Hutt a great deal of money and has a high price on his head. Bounty hunter Greedo (Paul Blake) tries to deliver Solo to Jabba, dead or alive, but after a failed attempt to extort the money as a bribe for letting him go, Han shoots and kills Greedo. Han then prepares to leave Tatooine.

He and his passengers are attacked by Imperial stormtroopers, but escape by accelerating to light speed. When they arrive at Alderaan, however, they discover that the planet has been destroyed by the Empire. The Falcon is then captured and held within the Death Star, a moon-sized battle station constructed by the Empire. Han and company hide from detection inside the Falcons smuggling bays, and infiltrate the station disguised as stormtroopers. They discover that Princess Leia Organa (Carrie Fisher) is a prisoner on board, and Luke convinces Han to help rescue her by promising him a huge reward. They rescue Leia and escape, though Obi-Wan is killed by Sith Lord Darth Vader (portrayed by David Prowse, voiced by James Earl Jones).

After delivering Luke, Leia, C-3PO, and R2-D2 to the Rebel Alliance, Han and Chewbacca receive a payment for their services and prepare to leave. Luke asks Han to stay and help the Rebels attack the Death Star, but he refuses, not wanting to get involved. Han has a change of heart and returns to save Luke's life during the film's climactic battle scene, ultimately enabling Luke to destroy the Death Star. In the film's final scene, Leia presents Han with a medal of honor alongside Luke and Chewbacca.

The Empire Strikes Back

Three years later, Han is still with the Rebel Alliance, and serving on the Rebels' base on the frozen planet of Hoth. While out on patrol with Luke, they witness a meteor strike the surface. Han returns to base while Luke decides to investigate. Han informs Leia that he must leave in order to clear his debt with Jabba the Hutt. Before he can depart, it is discovered that Luke has not returned from his investigation. Han rides out alone into the frozen Hoth wastelands, soon finding Luke near death from exposure. Using his friend's lightsaber, Han cuts open his tauntaun, providing Luke warmth while he builds a shelter until they can be rescued the next morning.

Later, Han and Chewbacca go to check on another meteor strike. They discover that the 'meteor' is actually an Imperial Probe Droid. The two succeed in destroying the probe, but not before the Empire is alerted to the location of the Rebel base. When the Empire attacks, Han, Chewbacca, Leia, and C-3PO narrowly escape on board the Millennium Falcon. Han evades a squad of Imperial TIE fighters by flying through an asteroid field, and unwittingly flies into the mouth of a giant worm. Han and Leia fall in love during the long journey. They manage to hide from the Imperial fleet long enough to escape, but not entirely unnoticed; bounty hunter Boba Fett (Jeremy Bulloch), working for Vader, picks up their trail and follows them.

Han and company eventually end up at the Bespin system's Cloud City seeking repairs and shelter from his old friend Lando Calrissian (Billy Dee Williams), the city's administrator. However, Fett had arrived first and alerted the Empire. Lando betrays Han to the Empire, and Vader has Han tortured as part of his plan to lure Luke to Bespin. Vader wishes to capture Luke by freezing him in carbonite, a fictional metal alloy, and subjects Han to the freezing process first to test its lethality. Han survives, and Fett leaves for Tatooine with his frozen body in tow to collect the bounty from Jabba.

Return of the Jedi

A year later, Han, still imprisoned in carbonite, is Jabba's favorite decoration at his palace on Tatooine. Luke attempts a rescue operation aided by Leia, Chewbacca, C-3PO, R2-D2, and a repentant Lando, but they are caught. Jabba sentences Han, Luke and Chewbacca to die in the sarlacc pit. Luke, Leia, Han, and Chewbacca overpower their captors and Leia kills Jabba, enabling their escape.

Returning to the Rebel fleet, they discover that the Empire is building the second Death Star, which orbits the forest moon of Endor. Following his return, Han is made a general in the Rebel Alliance, along with Leia. Reuniting with Luke after his return from Dagobah, Han leads a Rebel strike team to Endor to take down the force field surrounding the battle station, which is still under construction. The Empire captures them, but with help from the native Ewoks, Han and his team destroy the Death Star's shield generator, allowing Lando and his strike team to destroy the Death Star. Han then reunites with Leia and Luke on Endor to celebrate the defeat of the Empire.

Sequel trilogy

The Force Awakens
In The Force Awakens, set approximately 30 years after Return of the Jedi, Han has returned to his old life as a smuggler. Before the events of the film, he and Chewbacca had lost the Millennium Falcon to thieves, but they reclaim the ship after it takes off from the planet Jakku, piloted by the scavenger Rey (Daisy Ridley) and the renegade stormtrooper Finn (John Boyega). As mercenaries close in on them, Han takes the Falcon into light speed, and they get away.

When Han learns that Rey is looking for Luke, who disappeared years before, he takes them to his old friend Maz Kanata (Lupita Nyong'o), who can deliver the droid BB-8 to the Resistance against the tyrannical First Order. They are forced to flee when First Order troops descend upon them. Han is impressed with Rey's piloting skills, and offers her a job on the Falcon, but she declines. When Rey is kidnapped by the First Order, Han sees her being carried off by First Order warlord Kylo Ren (Adam Driver), whom Han seems to recognize.

Han and Finn meet with the Resistance, which is led by Leia, whom Han hasn't seen in a couple of years. It is then revealed that Ren is actually their son, Ben Solo, who trained as a Jedi under Luke. However, he was corrupted by the First Order's Supreme Leader Snoke (Andy Serkis), and turned to the dark side of the Force. As Kylo Ren, he betrayed the Republic and destroyed the Jedi—much like his grandfather, Darth Vader, had done decades before. Heartbroken by Ben's betrayal, Han and Leia became estranged to grieve in their own ways; each blaming themselves for their son's turning. Leia asks Han to find Ben and bring him home, convinced that there is still good in him.

Han and Chewbacca go with Finn to the First Order's planet-converted superweapon, Starkiller Base, to destroy the base and rescue Rey. There, he sees Ren walk onto the bridge above the reactor chasm. Han follows Ren onto the bridge, and calls out to him by his real name. Han pleads with him to abandon the dark side and come back with him, warning him that Snoke will kill him once he has taken control of the galaxy. Ren tells Han that he knows what he should do, but that he doesn't have the strength to do it, and asks Han to help him. Han agrees. After a moment, Ren ignites his lightsaber, impaling and fatally wounding his father. Han looks into his son's eyes and touches his face before falling off the bridge to his death.

The Last JediThe Last Jedi briefly pays homage to Han. The first scene includes a bomb which has "Han says hi" written on it in an alien language. Later in the film, Luke asks where Han is after reuniting with Chewie and learns of Han's death. During the climax, Luke hands Leia Han's gold dice (though this turns out to be part of an apparition).

The Rise of Skywalker
Han appears briefly in The Rise of Skywalker. After a near-fatal duel with Rey and the death of Leia, Ren experiences a vision of Han, who tells his son that Kylo Ren is dead, but Ben Solo is alive. Han urges his son to do the right thing and come back to the light side. In an allusion to their final interaction, Ren admits that he knows what he has to do but is not sure if he has the strength, while Han encourages his son and touches his face. Drawing his lightsaber, Ren turns and throws it away, becoming Ben Solo once again. When he turns around, Han has vanished. At the end, Chewbacca is given Han's medal from the end of the original film.

Anthology films
Solo: A Star Wars Story

A film featuring Han Solo before the events of the 1977 film was released on May 25, 2018, starring Alden Ehrenreich. In the film, 19-year old Han is characterized to be an orphan on the planet Corellia. He and his lover, Qi'ra (Emilia Clarke), attempt to escape from the White Worms criminal gang and bribe an Imperial officer with a stolen sample of coaxium, a powerful hyperspace fuel, in exchange for passage on an outgoing transport, but Qi'ra is apprehended before she can board. Han vows to return for her and joins the Imperial Navy as a flight cadet. He is given the surname "Solo" by the recruiting officer, apparently referencing Han's statement that he "has no people".

Three years later, Han has been expelled from the Imperial Flight Academy for insubordination and gets transferred to the Imperial Army. While serving as a swamp trooper in an infantry during a battle on Mimban, he encounters a gang of criminals posing as Imperial soldiers led by Tobias Beckett (Woody Harrelson). He tries to blackmail them into taking him with them, but Beckett has him arrested for desertion and thrown into a pit to be executed by a Wookiee outcast, Chewbacca. Able to speak Chewbacca's language, Han persuades Chewbacca to escape with him. In need of extra hands, Beckett rescues the two and enlists them in the gang's plot to steal a shipment of coaxium, which goes awry. Han and Chewbacca then accompany Beckett to explain their failure to Dryden Vos (Paul Bettany), a powerful crime lord in the Crimson Dawn syndicate and Beckett's boss. They also find Qi'ra, who is now Vos' top lieutenant. Han suggests a risky plan to steal unrefined coaxium from the mines on the planet Kessel; Vos approves, but insists that Qi'ra should accompany the team.

Qi'ra leads them to Lando Calrissian (Donald Glover), an accomplished smuggler and pilot who she hopes will lend them his ship. Han challenges Lando to a game of sabacc, with the wager being Lando's ship. Lando cheats to win but agrees to join the mission in exchange for a share of the profits. The team boards his ship, the Millennium Falcon, and heads for Kessel. The theft is a success partly thanks to Han piloting the ship through a dangerous uncharted route, but Han and Qi'ra become sympathetic to the Rebel Alliance, who are trying to prevent the syndicates and the Galactic Empire from gaining greater domination over the galaxy. They try to trick Vos, but Beckett has already alerted him to the double-cross. Vos sends his guards to kill the rebels, but having anticipated Vos' strategy, Han warns the Rebels, who kill the guards instead, rendering Vos defenseless. Han then tries to take the coaxium, only for Beckett to betray Vos, escape with the coaxium, and take Chewbacca hostage. Though pressured to kill Han in order to prove her loyalty to Vos, Qi'ra instead kills Vos and sends Han after Beckett before contacting Vos' superior, Maul (portrayed by Ray Park, voiced by Sam Witwer).

Han catches up to Beckett and shoots him to death before Beckett can return fire. Afterwards, Han and Chewbacca turn the coaxium over to the Rebels. Their leader, Enfys Nest (Erin Kellyman), offers Han a chance to join them; when he declines, she gives him one vial of coaxium, enough to purchase a ship of his own. Han and Chewbacca visit Lando, who unknowingly abandoned them in the Falcon when confronted by the Rebels earlier, and challenge him to another game of sabacc, once again wagering the ship. Han wins this time, having stolen the card Lando was using to cheat before, and he and Chewbacca leave for Tatooine in the Falcon, where a gangster is putting together a crew for a heist.

Television
In the Star Wars Holiday Special (1978), Han helps Chewbacca join his family on the Wookiee homeworld Kashyyyk. He faces Imperial forces on Kashyyyk, and later joins Luke, Leia, R2-D2, C-3PO, Chewbacca, and other Wookiees for their holiday, Life Day. It includes an animated segment, where Ford voices an animated Han Solo.

Han appeared in the animated Star Wars Forces of Destiny episode "Tracker Trouble" (2017), where he was voiced by Kiff VandenHeuvel.

 Literature 
In the (non-canon) Star Wars Expanded Universe, Han is from an old family line that stretches thousands of generations. An ancestor ruled the planet Corellia (the Solo homeworld) and set up a constitutional monarchy three centuries before the events of A New Hope. His descendants continued to rule Corellia, but slowly lost power leading up to the time of Han's birth. His parents were named Jonash and Jaina Solo. 

Brian Daley wrote a series of novels (The Han Solo Adventures), from 1979 to 1980, exploring Han Solo and Chewbacca's smuggling adventures before the events of the original trilogy. Kevin J. Anderson's Jedi Search (1994) establishes that before A New Hope, Jabba paid Kessel's spice kingpin for a shipment to be delivered by Han; the Kessel mogul then tipped off Imperials about Han's cargo, forcing the smuggler to dump it and incur his debt to Jabba. Ann C. Crispin's The Han Solo Trilogy (1997–1998) develops the character's backstory differently and in more detail, depicting him as a beggar and pickpocket throughout much of his youth. He becomes a pilot and, after his love interest disappears, joins the Imperial Navy. He is dismissed when he refuses an order to skin Chewbacca for commandeering a ship trafficking Wookiee children; Chewbacca, in turn, swears a "life-debt" to Han. The two become smugglers and help repel an Imperial blockade of a Hutt moon. Han wins the Millennium Falcon from Lando Calrissian in a card tournament. Han's adolescent flame, now a Rebel agent, employs him, Chewbacca, and Lando, then steals the smuggler's valuables to aid the Rebellion. To compensate their losses, Solo and Chewbacca accept the smuggling job from Jabba, but are forced to jettison their cargo.

Solo plays a central role in many stories set after Return of the Jedi. In The Courtship of Princess Leia (1995), he resigns his commission to pursue Leia, whom he eventually marries. Solo and Leia have three children: twins Jaina and Jacen and son Anakin. A cousin, Thrackan Sal-Solo, appears as an antagonist in the Corellian trilogy. Han is the general in command of the New Republic task force assigned to track down an Imperial warlord in the 1999 novel Solo Command. Chewbacca dies saving Anakin's life in Vector Prime (1999), sending Han into a deep depression. In Star by Star (2001), Anakin dies as well, compounding Solo's despair. At the end of the series, Han accepts his losses and reconciles with his family.

In the Legacy of the Force series, Jacen becomes the Sith Lord Darth Caedus and plunges the galaxy into a bloody civil war. Han disowns him, but is still devastated by each new outrage his son commits. He and Leia adopt Allana (Jacen's daughter) after Jacen's death at Jaina's hands in the novel Invincible.

In April 2014, most of the licensed Star Wars novels and comics produced since the originating 1977 film were rebranded by Lucasfilm as Star Wars Legends and declared non-canon to the franchise.

 Canon comics 
Han is a main character in the 2015 Star Wars comic series. Issue #6 introduces Sana Starros as Han Solo's wife, although a few issues later she is revealed to have only married him as part of a plan to scam a crime lord's gambling den.Star Wars: Han Solo (2016) is a five-issue mini-series set between A New Hope and The Empire Strikes Back, which focuses on Han participating in a race. The comic adaptation of Solo: A Star Wars Story reveals that Solo knew his father worked in the shipyards of Corellia. Han Solo – Imperial Cadet (2018) depicts his rebellious days under the Empire. Han Solo & Chewbacca (2022) depicts the duo doing a job for Jabba, who sends Greedo to accompany them.

Influence and critical reaction
Han Solo is a reckless smuggler with a sarcastic wit; he is "a very practical guy" and considers himself "a materialist"; but the adventures in the first Star Wars movie evoke his compassion, a trait "he didn't know he possessed".

The American Film Institute ranked Solo as the 14th greatest film hero. He was also deemed the 4th greatest movie character of all time by Empire magazine. Entertainment Weekly ranked the character 7th on their list of "The All-Time Coolest Heroes in Pop Culture". On their list of the "100 Greatest Fictional Characters", Fandomania.com ranked Solo at number 15. IGN listed Han Solo as the second greatest  Star Wars character of all time (behind Darth Vader), as well as listing him as one of the top 10 characters who most needed a spin-off, saying he was "Arguably the coolest character in the Star Wars universe".Prince of Persia producer Ben Mattes explained that their "inspiration was anything Harrison Ford has ever done: Indiana Jones, Han Solo". The antihero of the Japanese manga and anime Space Adventure Cobra has been compared by reviewers to Solo. In preparing to play James T. Kirk, Chris Pine drew inspiration from Ford's depictions of Han Solo and Indiana Jones, highlighting their humor and "accidental hero" traits.

Ford won a 2016 Saturn Award for Best Actor for his performance in The Force Awakens.

Merchandising
Solo has been merchandised in multiple media, including action figures, video games, and other collectibles. A Han Solo action figure with "human proportions" was released in 1977 to follow with the initial release of the original Star Wars films, while a figure created for the films' mid-1990s re-release was criticized as "unrealistically muscled."

In June 2018, Han Solo's blaster from 1983's Return of the Jedi'' was auctioned for $550,000. Ripley's Believe It or Not! bought the item at the Hollywood Legends auction at Planet Hollywood casino-resort in Las Vegas.

Relationships

Family tree

See also
 Han shot first
 Solo family
 Space Western

Notes

References

Further reading

External links
 
 
 Han Solo on IMDb

Characters created by George Lucas
Fictional space pilots
Film characters introduced in 1977
Fictional cadets
Fictional commanders
Fictional cryonically preserved characters
Fictional defectors
Fictional gamblers
Fictional generals
Fictional gunfighters in films
Fictional mechanics
Fictional mercenaries
Fictional military captains
Fictional military personnel in films
Fictional outlaws
Fictional prison escapees
Fictional revolutionaries
Fictional ship captains
Fictional smugglers
Fictional thieves
Fictional war veterans
Patricide in fiction
Male characters in film
Orphan characters in film
Space pirates
Star Wars Anthology characters
Star Wars comics characters
Star Wars literary characters
Star Wars Skywalker Saga characters
Star Wars video game characters
Fictional murdered people